Fernando Pedichini is an Italian astronomer at the National Institute for Astrophysics (INAF) and discoverer of an asteroid.

In 1996, he co-discovered the main-belt asteroid  together with Italian astronomer Andrea Boattini at the Campo Imperatore Observatory, where later the very successful Campo Imperatore Near-Earth Object Survey (CINEOS) took place.

References 
 

Living people
21st-century Italian astronomers
Discoverers of minor planets
Year of birth missing (living people)
20th-century Italian astronomers